Isenburg-Neumagen was the name of a state of the Holy Roman Empire, seated in Neumagen-Dhron in modern Rhineland-Palatinate, Germany.

Isenburg-Neumagen was created on the partition of Lower Isenburg in 1502. There were only two counts of Isenburg-Neumagen, and at their extinction it passed to the Counts of Sayn-Homburg.

Counts of Isenburg-Neumagen
Salentin VI 1502-1534
Henry 1534-1554

Counties of the Holy Roman Empire
1554 disestablishments
House of Isenburg
States and territories established in 1502
1502 establishments in the Holy Roman Empire